Nguyễn Văn Bách (born 2 January 2003) is a Vietnamese footballer who plays for V.League 2 side Quang Nam, on loan from Song Lam Nghe An for the 2022 season. The 2023 season has been completed. return to play. playing for V.League1 club Song Lam Nghe An

Club career
Nguyễn first developed his interest in football while in primary school; often being scolded by his parents for staying out late playing football with friends. He was spotted by Song Lam Nghe An (SLNA) scouts while playing at a youth tournament, and eventually went on to sign with the three-times Vietnamese champions.

He made his professional debut for SLNA in a 2–0 win over Hoang Anh Gia Lai.

Career statistics

Club

Notes

References

2003 births
Living people
Vietnamese footballers
Association football midfielders
V.League 1 players
V.League 2 players
Song Lam Nghe An FC players
Quang Nam FC players